Gilmore Lake in California is a backcountry lake in the Sierra Nevada mountain range, to the west of Lake Tahoe in the Desolation Wilderness. It can be reached by hiking west out of the Glen Alpine Springs trailhead near the town of South Lake Tahoe. This lake offers great fishing for Lake trout.

See also 
:Category:Lakes of the Desolation Wilderness
List of lakes in California
:Category:Lakes of the Sierra Nevada (United States)

External links 
Fishing Stories 

Lakes of the Desolation Wilderness
Lakes of the Sierra Nevada (United States)
Lakes of El Dorado County, California
Lakes of California
Lakes of Northern California